This Is Not a Test! is the fifth studio album by American rapper Missy Elliott, released by The Goldmind Inc. and Elektra Records on November 25, 2003, in the United States. It was primarily produced by Timbaland, with additional production from Craig Brockman, Nisan Stewart and Elliott herself.

The album received generally favorable reviews from critics. The album debuted at number thirteen on the US Billboard 200, selling 183,600 copies in the first week of release. It has been certified platinum by the Recording Industry Association of America (RIAA) and has sold 705,000 copies in the United States.

Critical reception

This Is Not a Test! was met with generally positive reviews. At Metacritic, the album received an average score of 79 out of 100, based on 21 reviews. Rob Sheffield of Rolling Stone gave the album four out of five stars, saying, "Why anybody would choose to spend their life without a copy of This Is Not a Test! is a mystery." Dan Martin of NME gave the album eight out of ten stars, saying the album was "all about the beats" and "not a right lot else", adding it was "Missy's most uncompromising work yet". Nick Catucci of Blender gave the album three out of five stars, saying the album "lacks feeling" and asked, "besides beats, what else does she care about?" John Bush of AllMusic gave the album three out of five stars, saying the album "is an effective argument for song-by-song downloads." This Is Not a Test! placed on Slant Magazine's list of best albums of the 2000s at number 87.

Commercial performance
This Is Not a Test! debuted at number thirteen on the US Billboard 200, selling 183,600 copies in the first week of release. The album stayed on the chart for a total of 19 weeks. On December 17, 2003, the album was certified platinum by the Recording Industry Association of America (RIAA) for shipments of over one million copies in the United States. As of November 2015, the album has sold 705,000 copies in the US.

Track listing

Sample credits 
 "Pass That Dutch":
 'The Rapper' by The Jaggerz (1970)
 'Magic Mountain' by Eric Burdon and War (1970)
 'Don't Let Me Be Misunderstood' by Santa Esmeralda (1977)
 'Potholes in My Lawn' by De La Soul (1989)
 'Scenario' by A Tribe Called Quest feat. Leaders of the New School (1991)
 "Keep It Movin":
 'I Know I've Been Wrong' by Mashmakhan (1970)
 "Is This Our Last Time":
 'The Second Time Around' by Shalamar (1979)
 "I'm Really Hot":
 'Buffalo Gals' by Malcolm McLaren (1982)
 'Release Yourself' by Aleem (1984)
 'Hot Music (Jazz Mix)' by Soho (1989)
 'Doin It' by LL Cool J (1995)
 "Don't Be Cruel":
 'Push It' by Salt-N-Pepa (1986)
 "Let It Bump":
 'I Cram to Understand U' by MC Lyte (1988)
 "Pump It Up":
 'Please, Please, Please' by James Brown and The Famous Flames (1956)
 "Let Me Fix My Weave":
 'Please Understand' by MC Lyte (1989)

Personnel

 June Ambrose – stylist
 Yaneley Arty – A&R
 Carlos "El Loco" Bedoya – engineer
 Beenie Man – vocals, guest appearance
 Ian Blanch – engineer
 Bless – scratching, group member
 Mary J. Blige – vocals, guest appearance
 Merlin Bobb – A&R
 Stacy Boge – photo production
 Anita Marisa Boriboon – art direction, design
 Craig "Boogie" Brockman – keyboards, producer
 Jay Brown – executive producer, A&R
 Suzanne Burge – product manager
 Demacio Castellon – mixing assistant
 Vadim Chislov – mixing assistant
 The Clark Sisters – vocals, guest appearance
 Annette Coleman – hair stylist
 Jimmy Douglass – engineer
 Elephant Man – vocals, guest appearance
 Missy Elliott – vocals, producer, executive producer
 Patricia Elliott – A&R
 Fabolous – vocals, guest appearance
 Roberto Fantauzzi – photo production
 Linda Fields – background vocals
 Andre Johnson – coordination
 Claudine Joseph – product manager
 R. Kelly – vocals, guest appearance
 Michael Kennedy – prop design
 Scott Kieklak – mixing
 Safiya Lewis – coordination
 Nelly – vocals, guest appearance
 Lili Picou – design
 Herb Powers – mastering
 Chris Puram – engineer
 Senator Jimmy D – mixing
 Nisan Stewart – producer
 Timbaland – producer, executive producer
 Alonzo Vargas – assistant engineer

Charts

Weekly charts

Year-end charts

Certifications

Release history

References

2003 albums
Albums produced by Craig Brockman
Albums produced by Missy Elliott
Albums produced by Timbaland
Missy Elliott albums
Elektra Records albums
Dancehall albums